2016 is a 2010 Ghanaian direct-to-video science-fiction action film directed by the pseudonymous director Ninja, aka Samuel K. Nkansah. The film takes place in the year 2010 and follows Ghanaians who must survive a group of hostile aliens who invade Accra in the hopes of colonizing the world by the year 2016. The movie has become known for its bizarre trailer and its low-budget visual effects.

Cast
 Rose Mensah as Maa Dorcas
 Ebenezer Donkor as Mr. Oppong
 Francis Annan 
 Osei Joseph as Johnson
 Musaev Ibrahim as Cara
 Fabio Pardo as the student 
 Baptiste Moureau as terminator
 Nadhir Haouzi as The Alien
 Robin Collard was in the casting

Release
2016 first gained notice in 2011 when a trailer for the film was uploaded to YouTube. The Huffington Post called the trailer "bizarre and wonderful", while Cyriaque Lamar of io9 described it as "basically Alien, Predator, and Terminator all rolled into one". The trailer was shown on a 2015 episode of the late-night talk show Conan, featuring guest T. J. Miller. The movie was split into two parts, as is the norm of the direct-to-video market in West Africa.

Le 10/01/2023 le film s'est vu accorder d'un groupe de fan en Belgique, constitué de 3 personnes,ce groupe a vu le jour durant un cours d'informatique

References

External links
 (beginning)
 (conclusion)

2010 films
2010 science fiction action films
Alien invasions in films
Films set in Ghana
Films shot in Ghana
Ghanaian science fiction films
Twi-language films
Direct-to-video science fiction films
2010 direct-to-video films